Bethel College was a Baptist-affiliated college in Kentucky founded in 1854 and closed in 1964.  Throughout most of its history, the Hopkinsville campus was a women's college while the Russellville campus was a men's college.

History 
The institution opened as Bethel Female High School in Hopkinsville, while the Russellville campus opened as Russellville Male Academy.  The Hopkinsville campus changed its name to Bethel College for Women four years later in 1858, taking in students continuing with the program.  The college changed its name again in 1917; the Russelville campus became Bethel College, and the Hopkinsville campus Bethel Women's Jr. College.  In 1951, the college became co-educational and changed its name to simply Bethel College.  It closed in 1964, with the Hopkinsville campus razed in 1966.  The last commencement for the Russellville campus was held on January 20, 1933.

A number of historical events have interacted with the college.  During the Civil War, the Russellville Convention, a meeting to set up a Confederate government of Kentucky in 1861, met at Bethel Female College on its third day.  The Hopkinsville campus was used as a hospital during a black measles epidemic from 1861 to 1862.  Later, during World War II, the Hopkinsville campus was closed from 1942 to 1945 and the rooms rented to Camp Campbell army officers.

Notable alumni

 Ben M. Bogard, clergyman, founder of the American Baptist Association, based primarily in Little Rock, Arkansas

References 

 http://library.blog.wku.edu/2011/04/13/baptist-begat-both-bethels
 
 http://www.westernkyhistory.org/christian/bethel.html
 https://web.archive.org/web/20100615045632/http://www2.westminster-mo.edu/wc_users/homepages/staff/brownr/KentuckyCC.htm
 
 

 
Independent Baptist universities and colleges in the United States
Defunct private universities and colleges in Kentucky
Former women's universities and colleges in the United States
Baptist Christianity in Kentucky
Buildings and structures in Logan County, Kentucky
History of women in Kentucky
Education in Logan County, Kentucky
Educational institutions established in 1854
Educational institutions disestablished in 1964
1854 establishments in Kentucky
1964 disestablishments in Kentucky
Education in Christian County, Kentucky
Buildings and structures in Christian County, Kentucky
Hopkinsville, Kentucky
Russellville, Kentucky